Kunal Bahl is an Indian technology entrepreneur and investor.

Early life
Bahl was born in India and had completed his initial school education at Delhi Public School R. K. Puram (DPS) New Delhi. He applied to the University of Pennsylvania and received admission. He graduated from the Jerome Fisher Program in Management and Technology at the University of Pennsylvania, earning two bachelor's degrees in Entrepreneurship, Operation & Information Management from The Wharton School and Engineering from the School of Engineering and Applied Science. He finished an executive marketing program from Kellogg School of Management. He worked with Microsoft for a short period, as he went back to India due to a visa issue in 2007.

Career
Bahl co-founded the e-commerce company Snapdeal in 2010. In 2022, the company assumed the group corporate identity of AceVector, which houses multiple businesses such as Snapdeal, Unicommerce, Stellaro Brands.

Bahl has also been involved with various industry associations and think-tanks. He has been on the board of governors of the Indian Council for Research on International Economic Relations, a member of the executive council of NASSCOM, and the chairman of the Confederation of Indian Industry (CII) National Committee on E-commerce. He also serves on the National Startup Advisory Council, a committee to advise the Indian government on efforts needed to build a strong startup ecosystem.

He also serves as an Independent Director on the Board of Piramal Enterprises, an Indian conglomerate.

Awards and recognitions
 BMA Entrepreneur of the Year 2014 
 ET Top 50 Entrepreneur of India 2014
 Ranked 25 on Fortune 40 under 40 most influential business leaders list 2014 
 EY Entrepreneur of the Year - Startup 2014 
 Nasscom NextGen Entrepreneur 2014 
The Economic Times Entrepreneur of the Year Award 2015
 AIMA Transformational Business Leader of the Year 
 Indian Affairs Business Leader of the Year 2015 
The Joseph Wharton Award for Young Leadership 2018
The Economic Times Comeback Award 2019

Personal life
Bahl is married to Yashna, who ran a confectionery business.

References

Living people
Businesspeople from Delhi
People from New Delhi
Wharton School of the University of Pennsylvania alumni
University of Pennsylvania School of Engineering and Applied Science alumni
Kellogg School of Management alumni
Indian chief executives
1984 births